Ove Andersson (3 January 1938 – 11 June 2008), nicknamed Påven ("the Pope"), was a Swedish rally driver and the first head of Toyota's F1 programme.

Early life
Andersson was born in Uppsala and grew up on a remote farm.  His father bought a 98cc motorbike, and Andersson said this was where he first fell in love with speed and machinery. He went on to begin studying engineering in Uppsala, and also began marshalling ice races.  He dropped his engineering course and began working as an apprentice to a blacksmith in the city. He then went on to work in a car repair shop, the owner of which encouraged Andersson to begin racing after showing him his skills with a motorbike.

In 1958, Andersson completed his compulsory military service with the United Nations (UN) peace-keeping force in the Gaza Strip. During this service he survived typhoid and a fire. Upon returning home he attempted to rejoin the UN but with little success. A friend encouraged him to join him in a rally, in which the pairing finished in 6th place. Local rally drivers saw that he had potential, but as he had little money he could not afford to race.  His friend Bengt Söderström became a Saab factory rally driver, and Andersson was able to borrow parts to make his car more competitive. The UN eventually offered him the opportunity to serve in the Congo, but he turned it down to concentrate on his rallying career.

Rallying career

In 1963, Andersson drove for the first time as a factory-backed driver in the Swedish Rally, using a Mini. He impressed the team boss, Stuart Turner, for him to be given a Mini Cooper S for the RAC Rally. He went on to drive for Saab in 1964 and 1965 but he felt he was in the shadow of Erik Carlsson whom Andersson believed was given better machinery by Saab. In 1965 he rallied the first three rounds of the championship with Lancia, finishing third in all of them. He also drove in the Swedish Rally Championship, and won the Swedish World Rally in a Lotus Cortina. In 1967, he won the Monte Carlo Rally with Lancia.

Despite being signed to Ford for 1968, Andersson competed in Daytona 24 hours with Lancia and also in the Monte Carlo Rally. At the end of the 1970 season, he was approached by Alpine whom he began to drive for in 1971. Andersson won the Monte Carlo Rally, Rallye Sanremo, Österreichische Alpenfahrt and Acropolis Rally with an Alpine A110, winning the International Championship for Manufacturers title for Alpine. In 1972, he came second in the Monte Carlo rally with Jean Todt as his co-driver. After the inauguration of the World Rally Championship in 1973, Andersson, drove mainly a Toyota Celica, achieved seven podium places in his 28 outings in the series and won the 1975 Safari Rally in a Peugeot 504, co-driven by Arne Hertz.

WRC victories
{|class="wikitable"
! # 
!Event
!Season
!Co-driver
!Car
|-
|1
| 23rd Safari Rally
|1975
|Arne Hertz
|Peugeot 504
|}

Complete IMC results

Toyota Team Europe
In the early 1970s, Andersson was also the owner of his own rally team Andersson Motorsport, which later became the Toyota Team Europe (TTE). In 1979 he moved the team from Uppsala to Cologne Germany where operations were based for an assault on the World Rally Championship.

TTE did not have regular rally victories until the 1980s with Juha Kankkunen and Björn Waldegård. The 1990s provided the bulk of success in World Rally for TTE, with Carlos Sainz, Juha Kankkunen and Didier Auriol providing success for the team. In 1993, TTE was purchased by Toyota Motor Corporation and renamed as Toyota Motorsport GmbH (TMG) by the Japanese automaker. At the end of the 1995 World Rally Championship season TMG was banned for twelve months from the WRC for using an illegal turbo restrictor on the Toyota Celica GT-Four ST205 that included both a bypass mechanism and spring-loaded devices to conceal it from scrutineers.

In addition to the World Rally exploits of Toyota Motorsport, the team attempted to win the Le Mans 24 Hours endurance race. The team created the Toyota GT-One race car, which was entered into the 1998 and 1999 races achieving a best result of second place.

Afterwards, the Cologne factory was sent into overdrive for a Formula One project. Andersson was set to oversee the new team, which designed and produced its first car in 2001. The Toyota TF101 was only a test prototype car to be used around the world before Toyota launched a formal attack on F1. It was driven by Mika Salo and Allan McNish who would also drive the car in its first competitive season, 2002. In charge for the troublesome first few years, Andersson retired in 2003 but was retained as a consultant to Toyota Motorsport.

Death

Andersson died in a vintage rally crash on 11 June 2008 near George, South Africa.

The Toyota F1 Team paid tribute to Andersson in a variety of ways. Toyota Motorsports director and its Formula One team chief at the time, Tadashi Yamashina, said he was shocked and saddened by the news. While at the 2008 French Grand Prix, both Toyota's ran black stripes on the car.  Jarno Trulli scored a podium finish at the event, and he dedicated it to Andersson.

References

External links
Ove Andersson Profile

1938 births
2008 deaths
Racing drivers who died while racing
Swedish rally drivers
World Rally Championship drivers
Sport deaths in South Africa
Formula One team principals
Motorsport team owners
Sportspeople from Uppsala